Pyrus regelii is a species of wild pear in the family Rosaceae, native to Central Asia (except Uzbekistan, where it occurs but is considered introduced). Its leaves, which are also downy when young, are exceptionally variable in shape, sometimes even on the same individual. The fruit are small but typical pears, and are collected and eaten by local peoples. The most xerophytic member of its genus, it is occasionally used as a rootstock for cultivated pear trees, as a garden ornamental, and for reforestation projects, all in dry areas.

References

regelii
Ornamental trees
Flora of Central Asia
Plants described in 1939